Schalk Wentzel Oelofse (born 2 November 1988) is a South African rugby union player who last played for the  in the Pro14. His regular position is lock.

Career

Oelofse made his first class debut for the  against . and then joined the  before the 2013 Currie Cup First Division season.

Mont-de-Marsan

In June 2016, French Rugby Pro D2 side  announced that Oelofse would join them for the 2016–2017 season.

References

South African rugby union players
Eastern Province Elephants players
Living people
1988 births
Rugby union players from Port Elizabeth
Southern Kings players
SWD Eagles players
Stade Montois players
Rugby union locks
Boland Cavaliers players